Operación Triunfo was the Mexican version of the Spanish TV series Operación Triunfo based on the international franchise Star Academy.

Season 1 (2002)
Only one sole edition was broadcast in Mexico in 2002, on the Mexican TV station Televisa. The sole season was hosted by Jaime Camil and the winner of the reality contest was Darina Márquez, becoming the first winner ever of a reality musical competition in Latin American history.

The jury was made up of:
Jaime Almeida: specialist, musical producer, conductor
Karen Guindi: compositor, Musical producer, conductor
Kiko Marti: musical producer and photographer
Manuel Calderón: musical director

The teachers were:
Patricia Reyes Spíndola: Academy director
Elena Lara: Academy coordinator
Fernando Lima: vocal coach
Jack Jackson: vocal techniques and interpretation
Víctor Manuel Ramos: vocal projection
Vico Rubín: interpretation and style
Marius Biegai: body expression
Verónica Falcón: choreographer, dance and movement
Rodolfo Ayala: dance and assistant choreographer
Pat Gordon: English pronunciation
Tere Ambé: spinning
Amado Cavazos: yoga
Sebastian Tapie: "traveler" , meditation

Contestants / results
The following table shows the names and backgrounds of the contestants, and the place occupied in the competition.

Originally only 16 Academy students were planned, but Martha King was also included with the gala shows.

No further seasons were made in Mexico. As of March 2020, there is no announcement regarding a reboot.

External links

 
2002 Mexican television series debuts
2002 Mexican television series endings